The city of Mohammad Abad  was originally built by Main Noor Mohammad Kalhoro, the 4th ruler of Sindh. Today only a graveyard and a few buildings remain.

Populated places in Dadu District
Cemeteries in Sindh
Islamic architecture